Phil Lynch (13 May 1890 – 15 August 1960) was an Australian rules footballer who played with St Kilda in the Victorian Football League (VFL).

Notes

External links 

1890 births
1960 deaths
Australian rules footballers from Victoria (Australia)
St Kilda Football Club players